Spinelli is an Italian surname. Notable people with the surname include:

 Altiero Spinelli (1907–1986), Italian advocate for European federalism and founding father of the European Union
 Anita Spinelli (1908-2010),  Swiss artist and painter 
 Anthony Spinelli (1927–2000), American director of pornographic films
 Antonio Spinelli C.R. (1657–1724), Italian Roman Catholic Bishop of Melfi and Rapolla 
 Ashley Spinelli, a character in the cartoon Recess (TV series)
 Barbara Spinelli (born 1946), Italian politician
 Brunello Spinelli (1939–2018), Italian water polo player 
 Chiara Spinelli (1744–1823), Italian noblewoman and pastellist.
 Claudio Spinelli (born 1998), Argentine footballer 
 Damian Spinelli, a fictional character on the American soap opera General Hospital
 Elisabetta Spinelli (born 1968), Italian voice actress
 Filippo Spinelli (1566–1616), Roman Catholic cardinal
 Francesco Spinelli (1853–1913), Italian Roman Catholic priest and founder of the Sisters Adorers of the Blessed Sacrament
 Fernando Spinelli, Argentine footballer
 Gennaro Spinelli, Prince of Cariati (1780–1851), Italian politician and diplomat
 Gérard Spinelli,  Mayor of the French town of Beausoleil, adjoining part of the Principality of Monaco
 Gianluca Spinelli (born 1966), Italian professional football goalkeeper coach
 Giovanni Battista Spinelli (c.1597–c. 1647), Italian painter
 Giuseppe Spinelli (1694–1763), cardinal prefect of the Congregation for the Evangelization of Peoples
 Giuseppe Spinelli (politician) (1908–1987), Italian politician
 Jerry Spinelli (born 1941), American author
 Juanita Spinelli (1889–1941), the first woman to be executed by the state of California
 Laurita Spinelli, with Carlotta Truman, the German duo of the Eurovision Song Contest 2019 
 Luca Spinelli, Swiss investigative journalist and the founder of the legal open source project Oscon
 Mitchell Spinelli, American pornographic film director and producer
 Nicola Antonio Spinelli C.R. (1583–1634), Italian Roman Catholic Bishop of Alessano
 Niccola Spinelli (1865–1909), Italian opera composer
 Parri Spinelli (c. 1387–1453, Italian painter of the early Renaissance
 Pietro Antonio Spinelli (1597–1645),  Roman Catholic Archbishop of Rossano
 Spinello di Luca Spinelli  (c. 1350–c. 1410), Italian painter from Arezzo
 Tomás Spinelli (born 1993), Argentine footballer
 Troiano Spinelli (1712–1777), Italian nobleman, economic-philosopher, and historian

Buildings 
 Palazzo Corner Spinelli, on the Grand Canal, Venice, Italy
 Palazzo Spinelli di Laurino, Naples, 15-century palace in central Naples, Italy
 Stadio Marco Spinelli, a municipal stadium in Alife, Italy

Other uses 
 Aguilar–Spinelli test, from the United States Supreme Court case, Spinelli v. United States
 Spinelli Group, a network planned for the so-called United States of Europa

See also 
 Spina (disambiguation)
 Spinetti

Italian-language surnames